Poul Villiam Borum (15 October 1934 – 10 May 1996) was a Danish writer, poet and critic. He was editor of the influential Danish literary magazine Hvedekorn from 1968 to his death in 1996. He also initiated the Danish writers school (Forfatterskolen) in 1987, of which he was also principal.
Borum was married to Danish poet Inger Christensen for 17 years; the couple had one son.

References

1934 births
1996 deaths
Danish male poets
Danish art critics
20th-century Danish poets
20th-century Danish male writers
Burials at the Garrison Cemetery, Copenhagen